The 2016 Minnesota Twins season  was the 56th season for the franchise in the Twin Cities of Minnesota, their seventh season at Target Field and the 116th overall in the American League. The 2016 season marked the 25th anniversary of the 1991 Twins World Series victory, and the 2016 team wore commemorative patches. The team finished in last place and lost 103 games, the worst record in the majors and the most losses since the franchise relocated to Minnesota in 1961.

Summary 
The Twins signed Korean baseball star Byung-ho Park in the offseason, in addition to acquiring John Ryan Murphy, a catcher, in a trade with the Yankees. The team's encouraging 83–79 finish the previous season behind good rookie seasons from Miguel Sano, Eddie Rosario, Tyler Duffey, and Byron Buxton, along with the anticipated arrival of Minor Leaguers José Berríos and Max Kepler, gave Twins' fans high hopes for the 2016 season. However, the season became a complete disaster, starting with the Twins losing their first nine games of the season and never getting out of last place in the AL Central. They finished with a record of 59-103, the worst in the league.  The 103 losses marked the worst record in Twins history, besting the 60-102 team of 1982.

Season standings

American League Central

American League Wild Card

Record against opponents

Game log

|- style="background:#fbb;"
| 1 || April 4 || @ Orioles || 2–3 || Britton (1–0) || Jepsen (0–1) || — || 45,785 || 0–1||L1
|- style="background:#fbb;"
| 2 || April 6 || @ Orioles || 2–4 || Gallardo (1–0) || Gibson (0–1) || Britton (1) || 12,622 || 0–2||L2
|- style="background:#fbb;"
| 3 || April 7 || @ Orioles || 2–4 || Jiménez (1–0) || Hughes (0–1) || O'Day (1) || 11,142 || 0–3||L3
|- style="background:#fbb;"
| 4 || April 8 || @ Royals || 3–4 || Soria (1–0) || Jepsen (0–2) || Davis (2) || 27,166 || 0–4||L4
|- style="background:#fbb;"
| 5 || April 9 || @ Royals || 0–7 || Kennedy (1–0) || Milone (0–1) || — || 31,001 || 0–5||L5
|- style="background:#fbb;"
| 6 || April 10 || @ Royals || 3–4 (10) || Davis (1–0) || May (0–1) || — || 35,317 || 0–6||L6
|- style="background:#fbb;"
| 7 || April 11 || White Sox || 1–4 || Quintana (1–0) || Gibson (0–2) || Robertson (3) || 40,638 || 0–7||L7
|- style="background:#fbb;"
| 8 || April 13 || White Sox || 0–3 || Rodon (1–1) || Hughes (0–2) || Robertson (4) || 21,008 || 0–8||L8
|- style="background:#fbb;"
| 9 || April 14 || White Sox || 1–3 || Latos (2–0) || Santana (0–1) || Robertson (5) || 19,736 || 0–9||L9
|- style="background:#bfb;"
| 10 || April 15 || Angels || 5–4 || Fien (1–0) || Salas (0–1) || Jepsen (1) || 22,461 || 1–9||W1
|- style="background:#bfb;"
| 11 || April 16 || Angels || 6–4 || Pressly (1–0) || Smith (0–1) || Jepsen (2) || 27,464 || 2–9||W2
|- style="background:#bfb;"
| 12 || April 17 || Angels || 3–2 (12) || Tonkin (1–0) || Rasmus (0–1) || — || 25,932 || 3–9||W3
|- style="background:#bfb;"
| 13 || April 18 || Brewers || 7–4 (6) || Hughes (1–2) || Anderson (1–1) || —  || 21,078 || 4–9||W4
|- style="background:#fbb;"
| 14 || April 19 || Brewers || 5–6 || Thornburg (2–0) || Jepsen (0–3) || Jeffress (5) || 17,597 || 4–10||L1
|- style="background:#fbb;"
| 15 || April 20 || @ Brewers || 5–10 || Nelson (3–1) || Pressly (1–1) || — || 21,087 || 4–11||L2
|- style="background:#bfb;"
| 16 || April 21 || @ Brewers || 8–1 || Nolasco (1–0) || Jungmann (0–3) || — || 30,107 || 5–11||W1
|- style="background:#fbb;"
| 17 || April 22 || @ Nationals || 4–8 || González (1–0) || Gibson (0–3) || — || 27,684 || 5–12||L1
|- style="background:#fbb;"
| 18 || April 23 || @ Nationals || 0–2 || Roark (2–2) || Hughes (1–3) || Papelbon (7) || 35,974 || 5–13 ||L2
|- style="background:#fbb;"
| 19 || April 24 || @ Nationals || 5–6 (16) || Pérez (1–0) || Tonkin (1–1) || — || 35,397 || 5–14||L3
|- style="background:#bfb;"
| 20 || April 25 || Indians || 4–3 || Jepsen (1–3) || McAllister (1–1) || — || 17,503 || 6–14||W1
|- style="background:#bfb;"
| 21 || April 26 || Indians || 6–5 || Jepsen (2–3) || Allen (0–2) || — || 17,493 || 7–14||W2
|- style="background:#fbb;"
| 22 || April 27 || Indians || 5–6 || Tomlin (3–0) || Berríos (0–1) || Allen (7) || 17,746 || 7–15||L1
|- style="background:#fbb;"
| 23 || April 29 || Tigers || 2–9 || Fulmer (1–0) || Hughes (1–4) || — || 23,049 || 7–16||L2
|- style="background:#fbb;"
| 24 || April 30 || Tigers || 1–4 || Zimmermann (5–0) || Duffey (0–1) || Rodríguez (6) || 31,109 || 7–17||L3
|-

|- style="background:#fbb;"
| 25 || May 1 || Tigers || 5–6 || Lowe (1–0) || Pressly (1–2) || Rodríguez (7) || 24,749 || 7–18||L4
|- style="background:#bfb;"
| 26 || May 2 || @ Astros || 6–2 || Berríos (1–1) || Keuchel (2–4) || — || 18,243 || 8–18||W1
|- style="background:#fbb;"
| 27 || May 3 || @ Astros || 4–6 || McHugh (3–3) || Meyer (0–1) || Gregerson (6) || 21,153 || 8–19||L1
|- style="background:#fbb;"
| 28 || May 4 || @ Astros || 4–16 || Feldman (1–2) || Hughes (1–5) || — || 20,847 || 8–20||L2
|- style="background:#fbb;"
| 29 || May 6 || @ White Sox || 4–10 || Latos (5–0) || Nolasco (1–1) || — || 23,054 || 8–21||L3
|- style="background:#fbb;"
| 30 || May 7 || @ White Sox || 2–7 || Sale (7–0) || Santana (0–2) || — || 28,049 || 8–22||L4
|- style="background:#fbb;"
| 31 || May 8 || @ White Sox || 1–3 || Quintana (5–1) || Duffey (0–2) || Robertson (10) || 23,801 || 8–23||L5
|- style="background:#bbb;"
| — || May 9 || Orioles || colspan="7" | Postponed (rain). Make-up date July 28. 
|- style="background:#fbb;"
| 32 || May 10 || Orioles || 3–5 || O'Day (2–0) || Jepsen (2–4) || Britton (8) || 21,586 || 8–24||L6
|- style="background:#fbb;"
| 33 || May 11 || Orioles || 2–9 || Wilson (2–1) || Hughes (1–6) || — || 25,094 || 8–25||L7
|- style="background:#fbb;"
| 34 || May 13 || @ Indians || 6–7 || McAllister (2–1) || May (0–2) || Allen (9) || 17,803 || 8–26||L8
|- style="background:#bfb;"
| 35 || May 14 || @ Indians || 6–3 || Santana (1–2) || Kluber (2–5) || — || 15,428 || 9–26||W1
|- style="background:#bfb;"
| 36 || May 15 || @ Indians || 5–1 || Duffey (1–2) || Bauer (3–1) || — || 13,236 || 10–26||W2
|- style="background:#fbb;"
| 37 || May 16 || @ Tigers || 8–10 || Zimmermann (6–2) || Dean (0–1) || Rodríguez (10) || 25,925 || 10–27||L1
|- style="background:#fbb;"
| 38 || May 17 || @ Tigers || 2–7 || Ryan (1–2) || Tonkin (1–2) || — || 27,652 || 10–28||L2
|- style="background:#fbb;"
| 39 || May 18 || @ Tigers || 3–6 || Verlander (3–4) || Nolasco (1–2) || Rodríguez (11) || 29,035 || 10–29||L3
|- style="background:#fbb;"
| 40 || May 19 || Blue Jays || 2–3 (11) || Osuna (2–0) || Pressly (1–3) || Biagini (1) || 25,435 || 10–30||L4
|- style="background:#fbb;"
| 41 || May 20 || Blue Jays || 3–9 || Sanchez (4–1) || Duffey (1–3) || — || 29,396 || 10–31||L5
|- style="background:#bfb;"
| 42 || May 21 || Blue Jays || 5–3 || Abad (1–0) || Happ (5–2) || Jepsen (3) || 30,460 || 11–31||W1
|- style="background:#fbb;"
| 43 || May 22 || Blue Jays || 1–3 || Stroman (5–1) || Hughes (1–7) || Osuna (9) || 33,421 || 11–32||L1
|- style="background:#fbb;"
| 44 || May 23 || Royals || 4–10 || Moylan (1–0) || Nolasco (1–3) || — || 17,886 || 11–33||L2
|- style="background:#fbb;"
| 45 || May 24 || Royals || 4–7 || Volquez (5–4) || Santana || Davis (12) || 23,541 || 11–34 || L3
|- style="background:#bfb;"
| 46 || May 25 || Royals || 7–5 || Duffey (2–3) || Gee (1–2) || Jepson (4) || 27,233 || 12–34 || W1
|- style="background:#bfb;"
| 47 || May 27 || @ Mariners || 7–2 || Dean (1-1)  || Hernandez (4-4)  || — || 40,921 || 13–34 || W2
|- style="background:#bfb;"
| 48 || May 28 || @ Mariners || 6–5 || Pressly (2-3)  || Vincent (2-2)  || Jepsen (5) || 28,309 || 14–34 || W3
|- style="background:#bfb;"
| 49 || May 29 || @ Mariners || 5–4 || Nolasco (2-3)  || Walker (2-5)  || Jepsen (6) || 33,748 || 15–34 || W4
|-style="background:#fbb;"
| 50 || May 30 || @ Athletics || 2–3 || Graveman (2–6) || Santana (1–4) || Madson (12) || 17,248 || 15–35 || L1
|-style="background:#fbb;"
| 51 || May 31 || @ Athletics || 4–7 || Dull (1–0) || Duffey (2–0) || Axford (1) || 12,767 || 15–36 || L2
|-

|-style="background:#fbb;"
| 52 || June 1 || @ Athletics || 1–5 || Manaea (2–3) || Dean (1–2) || — || 11,343 || 15–37 || L3
|-style="background:#bfb;"
| 53 || June 2 || Rays || 6–4 || Rogers (1–0) || Ramírez (6–4) || Jepsen (7) || 20,193 || 16–37 || W1
|-style="background:#fbb;"
| 54 || June 3 || Rays || 2–4 || Ramírez (7–4) || Nolasco (2–4) || Colomé (13) || 21,134 || 16–38 || L1
|-style="background:#fbb;"
| 55 || June 4 || Rays || 4–7 || Andriese (4–0) || Santana (1–5) || Colomé (14) || 26,613 || 16–39 || L2
|-style="background:#fbb;"
| 56 || June 5 || Rays || 5–7 || Cedeño (3–1) || Jepsen (2–5) || Colomé (15) || 25,510 || 16–40 || L3
|-style="background:#bfb;"
| 57 || June 7 || Marlins || 6–4 (11) || Boshers (1–0) || McGowan (0–2) || — || 19,020 || 17–40 || W1
|-style="background:#bfb;"
| 58 || June 8 || Marlins || 7–5 || Rogers (2–0) || Wittgren (1–1) || Kintzler (1) || 21,527 || 18–40 || W2
|-style="background:#fbb;"
| 59 || June 9 || Marlins || 3–10 || Koehler (4–6) || Santana (1–6)  || — || 18,792 || 18–41 || L1
|-style="background:#fbb;"
| 60 || June 10 || Red Sox || 1–8 || Wright (7–4) || Duffey (2–5)  || — || 22,786 || 18–42 || L2
|-style="background:#fbb;"
| 61 || June 11 || Red Sox || 4–15 || Hembree (3–0) || Gibson (0–4) || — || 28,633 || 18–43 || L3
|-style="background:#bfb;"
| 62 || June 12 || Red Sox || 7–4 (10)|| Tonkin (2–2) || Barnes (2–3) || — || 26,087 || 19–43 || W1
|-style="background:#bfb;"
| 63 || June 13 || @ Angels || 9–4 || Nolasco (3–4)|| Weaver (5–6)|| — || 36,424 || 20–43||W2
|-style="background:#fbb;"
| 64 || June 14 || @ Angels || 4–5 || Chacín (3–4) || Santana (1–7) || Street (7) || 36,272 || 20–44 ||L1
|-style="background:#fbb;"
| 65 || June 15 || @ Angels || 2–10 || Santiago (4–4) || Duffey (2–6) || — || 36,717 || 20–45 ||L2
|-style="background:#fbb;"
| 66 || June 16 || Yankees || 1–4 || Sabathia (5–4) || Gibson (0–5) || Chapman (12) ||  23,751 || 20–46 ||L3
|-style="background:#fbb;"
| 67 || June 17 || Yankees || 2–8 || Tanaka (3–2) || Dean (1–3) || – || 23,888 || 20–47 ||L4
|-style="background:#fbb;"
| 68 || June 18 || Yankees || 6–7 || Miller (4–0) || Abad (1–1) || Chapman (13) || 34,368 || 20–48 ||L5
|-style="background:#bfb;"
| 69 || June 19 || Yankees || 7–4 || Santana (2–7) || Eovaldi (6–4) || Kintzler (2) || 29,553 || 21–48 ||W1
|-style="background:#bfb;"
| 70 || June 21 || Phillies || 14–10 || Boshers (2–0) || Nola (5–7) || Kintzler (3) || 25,714 || 22–48 ||W2
|-style="background:#bfb;"
| 71 || June 22 || Phillies || 5–6 || Rogers (3–0) || Hernandez (1–2) || Abad (1) || 25,032 || 23–48 ||W3
|-style="background:#fbb;"
| 72 || June 23 || Phillies || 3–7 || Eickhoff (5–9) || Nolasco (3–5) || — || 30,012 || 23–49 ||L1
|-style="background:#fbb;"
| 73 || June 24 || @ Yankees || 3–5 || Tanaka (5–2) || Milone (0–2) || Chapman (14) || 36,090 || 23–50 ||L2
|-style="background:#fbb;"
| 74 || June 25 || @ Yankees || 1–2 || Miller (5–0) || Pressly (2–4) || Chapman (15) || 40,075 || 23–51 ||L3
|-style="background:#bfb;"
| 75 || June 26 || @ Yankees || 1–7 || Duffey (3–6) || Eovaldi (6–4) || — || 38,673 || 24–51 ||W1
|-style="background:#bfb;"
| 76 || June 28 || @ White Sox || 4–0 || Gibson (1–5) || Quintana (5–8) || — || 22,072 || 25–51||W2
|-style="background:#fbb;"
| 77 || June 29 || @ White Sox || 6–9 || Shields (3–9) || Nolasco (3–6) || Jones (2) || 18,571 || 25–52||L1
|-style="background:#fbb;"
| 78 || June 30 || @ White Sox || 5–6 || Jones (4–2) || Abad (1–2) || Robertson (21) || 26,158 || 25–53||L2
|-

|-style="background:#fbb;"
| 79 || July 1 || Rangers || 2–3 (10) || Bush (3-1) || Abad (1-3) || Dyson (17) || 25,530 || 25–54 ||L3
|-style="background:#bfb;"
| 80 || July 2 || Rangers || 17–5 ||Duffey (4–6)||Gonzalez (0–1)  || — ||21,466|| 26–54||W1
|-style="background:#bfb;"
| 81 || July 3 || Rangers || 5–4 || Gibson (2–5) || Hamels (9–2) || Kintzler (4) ||26,942|| 27–54||W2
|-style="background:#fbb;"
| 82 || July 4 || Athletics || 1–3 || Graveman (4–6) || Nolasco (3–7) || Madson (16) || 23,100 || 27–55||L1
|-style="background:#bfb;"
| 83 || July 5 || Athletics || 11–4 ||Milone (1–2)||Manaea (3–5)|| — ||16,938|| 28–55||W1
|-style="background:#bfb;"
| 84 || July 6 || Athletics || 4–0 ||Santana (3–7)||Gray (3–8)|| — ||27,657||29–55||W2
|-style="background:#bfb;"
| 85 || July 7 || @ Rangers || 10–1 ||Duffey (5–6)||Gonzalez (0–2)|| — ||43,934||30–55||W3
|-style="background:#fbb;"
| 86 || July 8 || @ Rangers || 5–6 ||Barnette (6–3)||Pressly (2–5)||Dyson (18)||40,330||30–56||L1
|-style="background:#bfb;"
| 87 || July 9 || @ Rangers || 8–6 ||Nolasco (4–7)||Lohse (0–1)||Kintzler (5)||37,708||31–56||W1
|-style="background:#bfb;"
| 88 || July 10 || @ Rangers || 15–5 ||Milone (2–2)||Griffin (3–1)||—||31,978||32–56||W2
|- style="text-align:center; background:#bbcaff;"
| colspan="10" | 87th All-Star Game in San Diego, California
|-style="background:#fbb;"
| 89 || July 15 || Indians || 2–5 || Carrasco (6–3) || Santana (3–8) || Allen (19) ||27,074||32–57||L1
|-style="background:#bfb;"
| 90 || July 16 || Indians || 5–4 (11) || May (1–2) || Colón (0–1) || — || 29,447 || 33–57||W1
|-style="background:#fbb;"
| 91 || July 17 || Indians || 1–6 ||Tomlin (10–2)||Gibson (2–6)|| — || 25,692 || 33–58||L1
|-style="background:#fbb;"
| 92 || July 18 || @ Tigers || 0–1 || Boyd (1–2) || Nolasco (4–8) || Rodríguez (26) || 29,290 || 33–59||L2
|-style="background:#bfb;"
| 93 || July 19 || @ Tigers || 6–2 || Milone (3–2) || Sánchez (5–11) || — || 32,030 || 34–59||W1
|-style="background:#bfb;"
| 94 || July 20 || @ Tigers || 4–1 || Pressly (3–5) || Rodríguez (1–1) || Kintzler (6) || 35,020 || 35–59||W2
|-style="background:#fbb;"
| 95 || July 21 || @ Red Sox || 2–13 || Wright (12–5) || Duffey (5–7) ||  || 37,566 || 35–60 ||L1
|-style="background:#bfb;"
| 96 || July 22 || @ Red Sox || 2–1 || Gibson (3–6) || Rodríguez (2–4) || Kintzler (7) || 37,001 || 36–60 ||W1
|-style="background:#bfb;"
| 97 || July 23 || @ Red Sox || 11–9 || Pressly (4–5) || Layne (0–1) || Kintzler (8) || 37,600 || 37–60 ||W2
|-style="background:#fbb;"
| 98 || July 24 || @ Red Sox || 7–8 || Porcello (13–2) || Milone (3–3) || Ziegler (19) || 36,806 || 37–61 ||L1
|-style="background:#fbb;"
| 99 || July 26 || Braves || 0–2 || Harrell (2–2) || Santana (3–9) || Johnson (3) || 26,690 || 37–62||L2
|-style="background:#fbb;"
| 100 || July 27 || Braves || 7–9 || Foltynewicz (4–4) || Duffey (5–8) || Johnson (4) || 29,482 || 37–63||L3
|-style="background:#bfb;"
| 101 || July 28 || Orioles || 6–2 || Pressly (5–5) || Despaigne (0-2) || — || 22,569 || 38–63||W1
|-style="background:#bfb;"
| 102 || July 29 || White Sox || 2–1 || May (2–2) || Jennings (4–3) || — || 23,983 || 39–63||W2
|-style="background:#fbb;"
| 103 || July 30 || White Sox || 5–6 (10)|| Ynoa (1–0) || Abad (1–4) || Robertson (25) || 29,482 || 39–64||L1
|-style="background:#bfb;"
| 104 || July 31 || White Sox || 6–4 || Santana (4–9) || Rodon (2–8) || Pressly (1) || 29,670 || 40–64 ||W1
|-

|-style="background:#bfb;"
| 105 || August 1 || @ Indians || 12–5 || Berríos (2–1) || Salazar (11–4) || — || 15,018 || 41–64 || W2
|-style="background:#bfb;"
| 106 || August 2 || @ Indians || 10–6 || Pressly (6–5) || Carrasco (7–5) || — || 15,835 || 42–64 || W3
|-style="background:#bfb;"
| 107 || August 3 || @ Indians || 13–5 ||Duffey (6–8) || Bauer (7–5) || — || 17,176 || 43–64 || W4
|-style="background:#fbb;"
| 108 || August 4 || @ Indians || 2–9 ||Otero (3–1)||Santiago (10–5)|| — || 19,193 || 43–65||L1
|-style="background:#bfb;"
| 109 || August 5 || @ Rays || 6–2 || Santana (5–9) || Ramírez (7–9) || — || 12,161 || 44–65||W1
|-style="background:#fbb;"
| 110 || August 6 || @ Rays || 3–7 ||Archer (6–15)||Berríos (2–2)|| Colomé (27) || 15,603 || 44–66||L1
|-style="background:#bfb;"
| 111 || August 7 || @ Rays || 6–3 || Gibson (4–6) || Andriese (6–3) || Kintzler (9) || 12,649 || 45–66 ||W1
|-style="background:#bfb;"
| 112 || August 8 || Astros || 3–1 || Duffey (7–8) || McHugh (7–9) || Kintzler (10) || 20,978 || 46–66 ||W2
|-style="background:#fbb;"
| 113 || August 9 || Astros || 5–7 || Fiers (8–5) || Santiago (10–6) || Giles (2) || 22,261 || 46–67||L1
|-style="background:#bbb"
|—||August 10||Astros 
|colspan="7"|Postponed (inclement weather) (Makeup date: August 11)
|-style="background:#fbb;"
| 114 || August 11 || Astros || 7–15 || Fister (11–7) || Berríos (2–3) || — || 25,960 || 46–68 || L2
|-style="background:#fbb;"
| 115 || August 11 || Astros || 2–10 || Devenski (1–4) || Milone (3–4) || — || 24,935 || 46–69 || L3
|-style="background:#fbb;"
| 116 || August 12 || Royals || 3–7 || Ventura (8–9) || Gibson (4–7) || — || 24,617 || 46–70 ||L4
|-style="background:#bfb;"
| 117 || August 13 || Royals || 5–3 || Duffey (8–8) || Gee (4–6) || Kintzler (11) || 30,147 || 47–70 || W1
|-style="background:#fbb;"
| 118 || August 14 || Royals || 4–11 || Vólquez (9–10) || Santiago (10–7) || — || 31,730 || 47–71 ||L1
|-style="background:#bfb;"
| 119 || August 16 || @ Braves || 5–3 || Santana (6–9) || De La Cruz (0–6) || Kintzler (12) || 17,611 || 48–71 || W1
|-style="background:#bfb;"
| 120 || August 17 || @ Braves || 10–3 || Gibson (5–7) || O'Flaherty (1–4) || — || 19,304 || 49–71||W2
|-style="background:#fbb;"
| 121 || August 18 || @ Royals || 1–8 || Gee (5–6) || Duffey (8–9) || — || 30,599 || 49–72 ||L1
|-style="background:#fbb;"
| 122 || August 19 || @ Royals || 4–5 (11) || Wang (6–0) || Chargois (0–1) || — || 28,463 || 49–73 ||L2
|-style="background:#fbb;"
| 123 || August 20 || @ Royals || 0–10 || Kennedy (8–9) || Santiago (10–8) || — || 29,263 || 49–74 ||L3
|-style="background:#fbb;"
| 124 || August 21 || @ Royals || 1–2 || Duffy (11–1) || Santana (6–10) || Herrera (7) || 32,996 || 49–75 ||L4
|-style="background:#fbb;"
| 125 || August 23 || Tigers || 3–8 || Sánchez (7–12) || Gibson (5–8) || — || 24,379 || 46–76||L5
|-style="background:#fbb;"
| 126 || August 24 || Tigers || 4–9 || Boyd (5–2) || Duffey (8–10) || — || 24,309 || 49–77||L6
|-style="background:#fbb;"
| 127 || August 25 || Tigers || 5–8 || Norris (2–2) || Berríos (2–4) ||  Rodríguez (35) || 26,437 || 49–78||L7
|-style="background:#fbb;"
| 128 || August 26 || @ Blue Jays || 8–15 || Liriano (7–12) || Dean (1–4) || — || 42,534 || 49–79 || L8
|-style="background:#fbb;"
| 129 || August 27 || @ Blue Jays || 7–8 || Grilli (5–3) || Pressly (6–6) || Osuna (29) || 47,485 || 49–80 ||L9
|-style="background:#fbb;"
| 130 || August 28 || @ Blue Jays || 6–9 || Feldman (7–4) || Light (0–1) || — || 47,444 || 49–81 ||L10
|-style="background:#fbb;"
| 131 || August 29 || @ Indians || 0–1 (10) || McAllister (3–2) || Kintzler (0–1) || — || 11,237 || 49–82 ||L11
|-style="background:#fbb;"
| 132 || August 30 || @ Indians || 4–5 || Otero (4–1) || Wimmers (0–1) || Miller (12) || 11,937 || 49–83||L12
|-style="background:#fbb;"
| 133 || August 31 || @ Indians || 4–8 || Kluber (15–8) || Dean (1–5) || Shaw (1) || 11,811 || 49–84 ||L13
|-

|-style="background:#bfb;"
| 134 || September 1 || White Sox || 8–5 || Santana (7-10) || Quintana (11-10) || Kintzler (13) || 20,329 || 50–84 || W1
|-style="background:#fbb;"
| 135 || September 2 || White Sox || 4–11 || Rodon (5–8) || Gibson (5–9) || — || 20,806 || 50–85 || L1
|-style="background:#bfb;"
| 136 || September 3 || White Sox || 11–3 || Santiago (11–8) || Shields (5–17) || — || 22,274 || 51–85 || W1
|-style="background:#fbb;"
| 137 || September 4 || White Sox || 11–13 (12) || Minaya (1–0) || Dean (1–6) || Kahnle (1) || 22,595 || 51–86 || L1
|-style="background:#fbb;"
| 138 || September 5 || Royals || 5–11 || Kennedy (10–9) || Berríos (2–5) || — || 20,992 || 51–87 ||L2
|-style="background:#fbb;"
| 139 || September 6 || Royals || 3–10 || Herrera (2–4) || Kintzler (0–2) || — || 22,194 || 51–88 ||L3
|-style="background:#bfb;"
| 140 || September 7 || Royals || 6–5 || Wimmers (1–1) || Soria (4–8) || Kintzler (14) || 17,972 || 52–88 ||W1
|-style="background:#fbb;"
| 141 || September 9 || Indians || 4–5 || Colón (1–1) || Duffey (8–11) || Allen (27) || 20,173 || 52–89 || L1
|-style="background:#bfb;"
| 142 || September 10 || Indians || 2–1 (12) || Chargois (1–1) || Colón (1–2) || — || 23,584 || 53–89 || W1
|-style="background:#fbb;"
| 143 || September 11 || Indians || 1–7 || Kluber (16–9) || Berríos (2–6) || — || 20,301 || 53–90||L1
|-style="background:#fbb;"
| 144 || September 12 || @ Tigers || 2–4 || Greene (4–4) || Wimmers (1–2) || Rodríguez (41) || 28,093 || 53–91 ||L2
|-style="background:#bfb;"
| 145 || September 13 || @ Tigers || 8–1 || Gibson (6–9) || Boyd (5–4) || — || 26,393 || 54–91||W1
|-style="background:#fbb;"
| 146 || September 14 || @ Tigers || 6–9 || Greene (5–4) || Pressly (6–7) || Rodríguez (42) || 27,953 || 54–92||L1
|-style="background:#bfb;"
| 147 || September 15 || @ Tigers || 5–1 || Santiago (12-8) || Pelfrey (4–10) || — || 26,932 || 55-92||W1
|-style="background:#fbb;"
| 148 || September 16 || @ Mets || 0–3 || Colón (14–7) || Berríos (2–7) || Familia (49) || 33,338 || 55–93||L1
|-style="background:#fbb;"
| 149 || September 17 || @ Mets || 2–3 (12)|| Edgin (1–0) || O'Rourke (0–1) || — || 36,941 || 55–94||L2
|-style="background:#fbb;"
| 150 || September 18 || @ Mets || 2–3 || Goeddel (2–1) || Gibson (6–10) || Blevins (2) || 28,926 || 55–95||L3
|-style="background:#fbb;"
| 151 || September 20 || Tigers || 1–8 || Matt Boyd (6–4) || Santiago (12–9) || — || 23,395 || 55–96||L4
|- style="background:#bbb;"
| — || September 21 || Tigers || colspan="7" | Postponed (rain). Make-up date September 22.
|-style="background:#fbb;"
| 152 || September 22 || Tigers || 2–9 || Wilson (4–0) || Wimmers (1–3) || — || 18,374 || 55–97||L5
|-style="background:#fbb;"
| 153 || September 22 || Tigers || 2–4 || Verlander (15–8) || Santana (7–11) || Rodríguez (44) || 21,599 || 55–98||L6
|-style="background:#fbb;"
| 154 || September 23 || Mariners || 1–10 || Paxton (5–7) || Gibson (6–11) || — || 22,683 || 55–99 || L7
|-style="background:#bfb;"
| 155 || September 24 || Mariners || 3–2 || Duffey (9–11) || Miranda (5–2) || Kintzler (15) || 24,749 || 56–99 || W1
|-style="background:#fbb;"
| 156 || September 25 || Mariners || 3–4 || Walker (7–11) || Santiago (12–10) || Díaz (17) || 22,092 || 56–100 || L1
|-style="background:#fbb;"
| 157 || September 27 || @ Royals || 3–4 (11) || Pounders (2–1) || Milone (3–5) || — || 28,435 || 56–101 || L2
|-style="background:#fbb;"
| 158 || September 28 || @ Royals || 2–5 || Soria (5–8) || Rogers (3–1) || Davis (27) || 23,437 || 56–102 || L3
|-style="background:#bfb;"
| 159 || September 29 || @ Royals || 7–6 || Tonkin (3–2) || Herrera (2–6) || Kintzler (16)  || 29,566 || 57–102 || W1
|-style="background:#fbb;"
| 160 || September 30 || @ White Sox || 3–7 || Rodon (9–10) || Duffey (9–12) || — || 19,007 || 57–103 || L1
|-

|-style="background:#bfb;"
| 161 || October 1 || @ White Sox || 6–0 || Santiago (13–10) || Shields (6–19) || — || 25,730 || 58–103 || W1
|-style="background:#bfb;"
| 162 || October 2 || @ White Sox || 6–3 || Berríos (3–7) || Sale (17–10) || Kintzler (17) || 21,904 || 59–103 || W2
|-

|-
| Legend:       = Win       = Loss       = PostponementBold = Twins team member

Roster

Farm system

References

External links
2016 Minnesota Twins season at Baseball Reference

2016
2016 Major League Baseball season
2016 in sports in Minnesota